Patricia Bray  is a romance and fantasy novelist.

Biography
Bray lives in New England where she works in IT and has a master's degree in Information Technology. She began by writing historical romances set in Regency England. She then began a new series of stories which were more epic fantasy in style and scale. Her books have been translated into multiple languages including Russian, German, Portuguese and Hebrew. Her novel Devlin's Luck won the Compton Crook Award in 2003. Bray also works as an editor, having edited a number of anthologies.

Bibliography

A London Season (1997)
An Unlikely Alliance (1998)
Lord Freddie's First Love (1999)
The Irish Earl (2000)
A Most Suitable Duchess (2001)
The Wrong Mr. Wright (2002)

Sword of Change
Devlin's Luck (2002)
Devlin's Honor (2003)
Devlin's Justice (2004)

Chronicles of Josan
The First Betrayal (2006)
The Sea Change (2007)
The Final Sacrifice (2008)

Collection
Bewitching Kittens (1998) (with Janice Bennett and Cathleen Clare)

As editor
After Hours (2011) (with Joshua Palmatier)
The Modern Fae's Guide to Surviving Humanity (2012) (with Joshua Palmatier)
Clockwork Universe: Steampunk vs Aliens (2014) (with Joshua Palmatier)
Temporally Out of Order (2015) (with Joshua Palmatier)
Alien Artifacts (2016) (with Joshua Palmatier)
Were- (2016) (with Joshua Palmatier)
All Hail Our Robot Conquerors! (2017) (with Joshua Palmatier)
Second Round (2018) (with Joshua Palmatier)
Portals (2019) (with S C Butler)

References and sources

Living people
Year of birth missing (living people)
21st-century American women writers
American fantasy writers
American romantic fiction writers